The Owatonna Subdivision or Owatonna Sub is a railway line in northern Iowa and southern Minnesota owned and operated by the Iowa, Chicago and Eastern Railroad (IC&E) subsidiary of Canadian Pacific. U.S. Highway 218 closely follows the rail line between Lyle, Minnesota and Owatonna.

Most of the line is dark territory, meaning that it is not signaled or equipped with centralized traffic control or automatic block signaling systems. The line is dispatched via radio using track warrant control.

This line had been under control of the Chicago, Milwaukee, St. Paul and Pacific Railroad (Milwaukee Road) for many years, then became part of the Soo Line Railroad and later Canadian Pacific.  Canadian Pacific eventually sold off the line to I&M Rail Link in 1997, a company 67% owned by Washington Corporation (CP retained the remaining 33% ownership).  Washington Corporation divested itself of I&M, so the Iowa, Chicago and Eastern was formed in 2002.  The IC&E was owned by the Dakota, Minnesota and Eastern Railroad holding company Cedar American Railroad Holdings.  In 2007, Canadian Pacific moved to purchase DM&E and its related companies, which was completed in 2008.

About four trains a day, carrying mostly agricultural products, operate on the line. In 2013 the Line started Being Operated and owned By Canadian Pacific causing the ICE to stop running the DME continued to run in 2016 the railfans around here started to see less DME trains And More Canadian Pacific trains The Owatonna Subdivision starts in Mason City IA and goes North to owatonna In 2018 The Canadian Pacific Started to gradually slow down the operations on this line The Owatonna Subdivision today in 2020 is still used and operated by the Canadian Pacific Railway But the line has been used mostly for Ethanol and grain hoppers The IANR Trainmaster Donny Rehlander announced in 2011 that they have purchased the ex UP line From Belmond To Forest City the Iowa Northern leases the Canadian Pacific Sheldon Subdivision line for them to head west from Nora Springs To Garner The CP Owatonna Subdivision line Has the old IATR Lime creek Subdivision line next to it is abandoned the IATR filed for abandonment of this old line in June 2000 were the Line stays there as a decoration for the city of Mason City More NS CSX and UP trains have started to do ethanol moves on the CP Owatonna Subdivision line the Train will start to become more busy as the years go helping support the small town elevators produce more ethanol with more corn to store Five star Co-op in Carpenter IA has announced a much bigger corn supply due to more trains running past The Canadian Pacific Railway announced in July 2020 they are very proud to serve all these small town elevators from Mason City to Owatonna the North Iowa Co-op then said the corn bins are being upgraded to store more corn to produce more ethanol saving 100 truckloads a year Meaning Corn being shipped By truck to decrease and Corn being shipped by train To increase as the years go.

References

Iowa, Chicago and Eastern Railroad
Rail infrastructure in Iowa
Rail infrastructure in Minnesota